Gołda Tencer (yid. גאָלדע טענצער, born 2 August 1949 in Łódź) is a Polish actress and singer.

Gołda Tencer was born to a Jewish family, the daughter of Szmul and Sonia Tencer. In 1971 she graduated from Actors Studio in Warsaw. In 1984, as a scholar of the United States government, she explored theater life in the U.S.

At present, Tencer is an actress and director of the Jewish Theatre in Warsaw.

Filmography 
 2007: Liebe nach Rezept – as Rosha
 2004: Alles auf Zucker! – as Golda Zuckermann
 1985: War and Love
 1983: The Winds of War
 1983: Haracz szarego dnia – as Róża
 1982: Hotel Polan und Seine Geste – as miss Menasze
 1982: AusteriaAusteria – as Blanka
 1979: Komedianci
 1979: Gwiazdy na dachu
 1979: DybukDybuk – as Lea
 1979: Doktor Murek – as Kapelewicz's daughter
 1979: David

Songs 
 Ballady i romanse
 Bei Mir Bistu Shein
 Cadikim
 Dieta
 Dudele
 Ejli, Ejli
 Fraytik Oyf Der Nakht
 Josl, Josl
 Kinder Jorn
 Mein Jidishe Mame
 Mein Shtetele Belz
 Rebeka
 Rebns Nysn
 Rozinkes mit Mandlen
 Sekrety drzew
 Varnitshkes
 Zemerl

References

External links 
 

1949 births
Polish women singers
Jewish Polish actresses
Living people